Timeless is the first full album by Japanese rock band Uverworld. The album was released on February 15, 2006. The album entered the Oricon charts 33 times and it was ranked 5th at its peak. The album was certified gold by the Recording Industry Association of Japan.

On November 22, 2006, another edition of the album titled as Timeless (Special Edition) was released. This edition was only sold from November 22, 2006 to December 29, 2006. This edition includes a DVD containing three music videos and a thirty-minute interview with the band as well as the tracks from the original release. This edition's peak ranking was at 32nd and entered the Oricon album charts 8 times. The album cover and single covers feature UVER CHAN, a character created by Uglydoll co-creator, David Horvath. Horvath illustrated all of the covers and the inner imagery for the limited release of Timeless.

Track listing

References

2006 debut albums
Uverworld albums
Gr8! Records albums
Japanese-language albums